Blu-ray Disc Recordable (BD-R) refers to two direct to disc optical disc recording technologies that can be recorded on to a Blu-ray-based optical disc with an optical disc recorder. BD-R discs can be written to once, whereas Blu-ray Disc Recordable Erasable (BD-RE) can be erased and re-recorded multiple times. Disc capacities are 25 GB for single-layer discs, 50 GB for double-layer discs, 100 GB ("XL") for triple-layer, and 128 GB for quadruple-layer (in BD-R only).

The minimum speed at which a Blu-ray Disc can be written is 36 megabits (4.5 megabytes) per second.

Version
, there are five versions of Blu-ray Disc Recordable Erasable (BD-RE) and four versions of Blu-ray Disc Recordable (BD-R). Each version includes three Parts (a.k.a. Books): Basic Format Specifications, File System Specifications, Audio Visual Basic Specifications. Each part has sub-versions (e.g. R2 Format Specification includes Part 3: Audio Visual Basic Specifications Ver.3.02, Part 2: File System Specifications Ver. 1.11, Part 1: Basic Format Specifications Ver. 1.3).

Speed

, the following speeds are seen in Blu-Ray specifications for R/RE discs:

2× speeds are mandatory for all formats, with 4× and 6× being optional for non-XL BD-R media. Since BD-RE 5.0/BD-R 4.0, a read speed of 4× is mandatory for UHD support.

Note: Add extra time for disc verification phase and time for erasing the disc in the case of BD-RE.

Pricing 
 (approximate pricing):
 BD-R/RE drive US$50 and above
 6× single-layer BD-R disc (25 GB) US$0.42 each in quantity;
 10× single-layer BD-R disc (25 GB) CN¥2.04 each in quantity;
 6× double-layer BD-R disc (50 GB) US$1.64 in quantity;
 2× single-layer BD-RE disc (25 GB) US$0.82 in quantity;
 2× double-layer BD-RE disc (50 GB) US$3.15 in quantity;
4× BD-R XL disc (100 GB) US$5 in quantity;
 4× BD-RE XL disc (100 GB) US$11 in quantity;

Recording mechanisms 
Instead of the pits and lands found on prepressed/prerecorded/replicated discs, BD-R and RE discs contain grooves which contain a wobble frequency that is used to locate the position of the reading or writing laser on the disc.
BD-R has an Optimum Power Calibrations (OPC) / Test Zone, which is used to calibrate (finely adjust) the power of the writing laser before and during writing, and it also has a Drive Calibration Zone (DCZ) at the outer edge of the disc, for optional high speed calibration. The calibration is necessary to allow for slight manufacturing defects, greatly reducing or completely eliminating rejected discs and drives, reducing costs and eliminating potential waste.  
The information below describes the different types of recording layers that may be used on BD-R and BD-RE discs.

HTL (high to low)
"Normal" BD-R discs use a composite (or, in the case of BD-RE, a phase-changing alloy) that decreases its reflectivity on recording, i.e. "High To Low". Sony, for example, uses an inorganic composite that splits into two laminar components with low reflectivity. Composites used may include BiN, Ge3N4, and Pd-doped tellurium suboxide. A pair of layers with copper alloy and silicon that combines on recording may alternatively be used. Similar to CD-RW and DVD-RW, a phase transition alloy (often GeSbTe or InAgTeSb; copper silicate (CuSi) or other alloys can also be used, like Verbatim's proprietary MABL) is used for BD-RE discs. Melting the material with a very high power beam turns it into an amorphous state with low reflectivity, while heating at a lower power erases it back to a crystalline state with high reflectivity.

In BD-RE discs, the data layers are surrounded by a pair of dielectric Zinc Sulfur-Silicon Dioxide layers. An adhesive spacer layer and a semi-reflective layer are used for multi-layer discs. The recording and dielectric layers are all deposited using Sputtering. On multi-layer BD-RE discs, each GeSbTe recording layer is progressively thinner. So the first layer (L0) is 10 nm thick, L1 is 7.5 nm thick, L2 is 6 nm thick, and so on. The silver alloy reflective layers that are behind each recording layer also become progressively thinner, so the L0 silver layer is 10 nm thick, the L1 layer is 9 nm thick, the L2 layer is 7 nm thick, and so on. The separation layers that separate the recording layers from one another also progressively become thinner.

BD-R LTH (low to high)
BD-R LTH is a write-once Blu-ray Disc format that features an organic dye recording layer. "Low To High" refers to the reflectivity changing from low to high during the burning process, which is the opposite of normal Blu-rays, whose reflectivity changes from high to low during writing. The advantage of BD-R LTH is it can protect a manufacturer's investment in DVD-R/CD-R manufacturing equipment because it does not require investing in new production lines and manufacturing equipment. Instead, the manufacturer only needs to modify current equipment. This is expected to lower the cost of disc manufacturing.

Old Blu-ray players and recorders cannot utilize BD-R LTH; however, a firmware upgrade can enable devices to access BD-R LTH. Panasonic released such a firmware update in November 2007 for its DMR-BW200, DMR-BR100 and MR-BW900/BW800/BW700 models. Pioneer was expected to ship the first LTH BD drives in Spring 2008. Sony upgraded the PlayStation 3 firmware enabling BD-R LTH reading in March, 2008.

In 2011, France's Ministry of Culture and Communication conducted a study on the suitability of data archival of LTH (low to high) discs compared to HTL (high to low) discs. The data they collected indicated that the overall quality of LTH discs is worse than HTL discs.

See also
 Blu-ray
 Optical disc authoring
 List of optical disc manufacturers
 CD-R, DVD±R

Notes

References

External links
 Blu-ray Player BD-R Compatibility Chart

Audio storage
Audiovisual introductions in 2002
Blu-ray Disc
Consumer electronics
Rotating disc computer storage media
Optical computer storage media